Eucalyptus suggrandis is a species of mallee that is endemic to the southwest of Western Australia. It has smooth, shiny bark, linear to elliptical leaves, flower buds in groups of three or seven, creamy white flowers and cup-shaped to conical fruit.

Description
It has smooth shiny, greyish, to brownish bark. Flowering occurs between November and March and the flowers are creamy white.

Taxonomy and naming
Eucalyptus suggrandis was first formally described in 1992 by Lawrie Johnson and Ken Hill in the journal Telopea from specimens collected by Hill in the Fitzgerald River National Park in 1988. The specific epithet (suggrandis) is from Latin meaning "rather large", referring to the size of the buds compared to those of the related E. spathulata and E. vergrandis.

In the same paper, Johnson and Hill described two subspecies, but only the autonym is accepted, the other subspecies having been raised to species status as Eucalyptus alipes. In 2005, Dean Nicolle and Ian Brooker described a second subspecies. The names of the two subspecies are accepted by the Australian Plant Census:
 Eucalyptus suggrandis subsp. promiscua D.Nicolle & Brooker has flower buds in groups of three;
 Eucalyptus suggrandis L.A.S.Johnson & K.D.Hill subsp. suggrandis has flower buds in groups of seven.

Distribution and habitat
This mallee is found on sandplains, rises, along drainage lines and in breakaways in the Goldfields-Esperance and Wheatbelt regions where it grows in sandy-clay-loam soils over quartzite, laterite or granite. Subspecies promiscua has a more westerly distribution between Pingaring, Jerramungup and Lake King.

Conservation status
This eucalypt species and both subspecies are classified as "not threatened" by the Western Australian Government Department of Parks and Wildlife.

See also
List of Eucalyptus species

References

Eucalypts of Western Australia
suggrandis
Myrtales of Australia
Mallees (habit)
Plants described in 1992
Taxa named by Lawrence Alexander Sidney Johnson
Taxa named by Ken Hill (botanist)